Oslo University College (HiO) was the largest state university college in Norway from 1994 to 2011, with more than 18,000 students and approximately 1800 employees. Oslo University College merged with Akershus University College to form Oslo and Akershus University College in 2011, and this institution became Oslo Metropolitan University in 2018.

OUC was established on 1 August 1994 when the Norwegian college system was restructured and 18 smaller colleges in the Oslo area merged. From the 2000s most of the school was located in the city centre of Oslo along Pilestredet street. The main campus was the previous Frydenlund Brewery near Bislett stadium. OUC offered the broadest portfolio of professional studies available in Norway. The language of instruction was Norwegian.

Faculties
Faculty of Art, Design and Drama
Faculty of Social Sciences
Faculty of Education and International Studies
Faculty of Engineering
Faculty of Health Sciences
Faculty of Journalism, Library and Information Science
Faculty of Nursing

Centres
Centre for Educational Research and Development
Centre for the Study of Professions
National Centre for Multicultural Education
Learning Centre

References

External links
Oslo University College website

 
Education in Oslo
Oslo
Florence Network
Educational institutions established in 1994
1994 establishments in Norway